Leuctrum or Leuktron may refer to:
Leuctrum (Achaea), a town of ancient Achaea
Leuctrum (Arcadia), a town of ancient Arcadia
Leuctrum (Laconia), a town of ancient Laconia